Raymond B. Allen (1902–1986) was an American educator. He served as the president of the University of Washington in Seattle, Washington, from 1946 to 1951, and as the first chancellor of the University of California, Los Angeles from 1951 to 1959.

Biography

Early life
Raymond Bernard Allen was born on August 7, 1902, in Cathay, North Dakota. He attended the University of Minnesota, where he received a PhD and MD.

Career
He started his career as a general practitioner in Minot, North Dakota.

He served as dean of the University of Illinois College of Medicine, dean of the Wayne State University School of Medicine and associate dean for graduate studies at the Columbia University College of Physicians and Surgeons.

He served as president of the University of Washington from 1946 to 1951. He dismissed three Communist professors, arguing that "a Communist is incompetent to teach the truth." However, he refused to give a list of texts taught at UW to the House Un-American Activities Committee.

Allen briefly served as chair of the newly created Armed Forces Medical Policy Council in 1949. He was director of the Psychological Strategy Board in 1952.

When UCLA was granted co-equal status with UC Berkeley in 1951, its presiding officer was granted the title of chancellor. Allen was tapped as the newly autonomous UCLA's first chancellor, a post he held until 1959. He was recommended for the job by Robert Gordon Sproul, who served as president of the University of California, serving from 1930 to 1958. During his tenure, the UCLA Medical Center was built and the Schools of Medicine, Dentistry, and Nursing were developed, as well as the Neuropsychiatric Institute. He resigned after a three-year investigation led to the revelation of corruption between football players and the Pacific Coast Conference.

He also served as director of research and population dynamics for the Pan American Health Organization. He was a Fellow of the Mayo Foundation.

Personal life
He had two sons, Charles and  Raymond B. Allen Jr., and two daughters, Dorothy Allen and Barbara Sheard. He retired in Virginia in 1967. He died on March 15, 1986, in Fredericksburg, Virginia, at the age of eighty-three.

Bibliography
Medical Education and the Changing Order (Commonwealth Fund, 1946)
Communists Should Not Teach in American Colleges (1949)

References

1902 births
1986 deaths
People from Wells County, North Dakota
People from Fredericksburg, Virginia
University of Minnesota Medical School alumni
University of Illinois faculty
Wayne State University faculty
Columbia Medical School faculty
Presidents of the University of Washington
Leaders of the University of California, Los Angeles
Anti-communism in the United States
American primary care physicians
20th-century American academics